Serhiy Silyuk (born 5 June 1985 in Zaporizhzhia) is a Ukrainian football forward who last played for Ukrainian Premier League side Vorskla Poltava.

See also
 2005 FIFA World Youth Championship squads#Ukraine

External links

Profile on Official Metalurh Zaporizhya website 

1985 births
Living people
Footballers from Zaporizhzhia
Ukrainian footballers
Ukraine youth international footballers
Ukraine under-21 international footballers
Ukrainian Premier League players
FC Metalurh Zaporizhzhia players
FC Zorya Luhansk players
FC Vorskla Poltava players
Association football forwards